Petushki is a rural locality (a selo) under the administrative jurisdiction of the Settlement of Chersky in Nizhnekolymsky District of the Sakha Republic, Russia, located  from Chersky. Its population as of the 2010 Census was 0. Its population was estimated at 136 in 2005, down from 149 recorded in the 2002 Census.

It was slated for liquidation in 2005 but has not been officially abolished as of 2009.

References

Notes

Sources
Official website of the Sakha Republic. Registry of the Administrative-Territorial Divisions of the Sakha Republic. Nizhnekolymsky District. 

Rural localities in Nizhnekolymsky District